Hayden James Lockhart (born June 16, 1938) is a retired United States Air Force officer who is best known for being the first U.S. Air Force pilot to be shot down in North Vietnam.

Early life
Lockhart was born in Cambridge, Massachusetts and graduated in 1961 from the U.S. Air Force Academy at Colorado Springs, Colorado.

Military career

Early career
Lockhart was originally stationed at Luke Air Force Base where he attended Fighter Gunnery School.

Lockhart was commissioned a second lieutenant on June 7, 1961.  He was assigned to the 613th Tactical Fighter Squadron flying the North American F-100 Super Sabre. He arrived in Vietnam in 1964.

Vietnam shoot down

Lockhart was shot down March 2, 1965, when he was forced to eject over North Vietnam. After his ejection he evaded capture until March 12, 1965.

“…By summer 1965, more than thirty American airmen had been killed or were presumed missing in action and a dozen had been captured, including the first Air Force POW, Lieutenant Hayden Lockhart. The Navy pilots in this group included Lieutenant Commanders Robert H Shumaker, Raymond Vohden and Lieutenants Phillip Butler and John McKamey…"

Prisoner of War in North Vietnam: 3/2/1965 to 2/12/1973 

Hayden was the third American captured in North Vietnam, and the first Air Force pilot captured in the North during the Vietnam War.

Lockhart spent his time in captivity at several POW locations: New Guy Village 1965; Heartbreak Hotel 1965; The Briarpatch in August 1965; Zoo 1966; Zoo Annex 1967; Camp Unity at Hỏa Lò Prison also known as the Hanoi Hilton; Dogpatch (9 miles south of the Chinese border) May 1972; and Hỏa Lò prison again in Jan 1973.

On July 6, 1966, 52 US Prisoners of War were taken on the March of Hanoi. 52 US POW's were paraded, handcuffed in pairs, down the main street of Hanoi while angry crowds of people screamed, spat and threw objects at them. A  photo, (published in Look magazine 1970) showed Lockhart supporting fellow prisoner of war, Phil Butler, who was dazed after being struck by a thrown bottle.

The prisoners supported each other and communicated using a Tap Code that Lockhart's fellow POW, Carlyle "Smitty" Harris, had learned in a survival school.

He was released during "Operation Homecoming" on February 12, 1973.

After release
Lockhart received an Air Force Institute of Technology assignment to the University of Southern California at Los Angeles to complete his graduate degree.

After Vietnam
His final assignment was on the staff of the Air Force Inspection and Safety Center at Norton AFB, California, from February 1980 until his retirement from the Air Force on December 31, 1981.

Later life
Lockhart retired as a Lieutenant Colonel 0-5, US Air Force.

Honors and awards

Lockhart received the Silver Star, Legion of Merit, Distinguished Flying Cross and Prisoner of War Medal, all after his service in the Vietnam War.

Bibliography

 Alvarez, Everett and Schreiner, Samuel. Code of Conduct: An Inspirational story of self-healing by the famed ex-pow and war hero, (1991) Donald L Fine, publisher New York. 
 Borling, John: Taps on the Walls: Poems from the Hanoi Hilton, Master Wing Publishing, Pritzker Military Museum and Library 2013 first published as Poems for Pilots (and other people.) 
 Head, William and Grinter Lawrence E; Looking Back on the Vietnam War: A 1990's Perspective on the Decisions, Combat, and Legacies. 1993 Greenwood Press, Westport Connecticut 
 Wyatt, Captain and Mrs. Frederick A. Wyatt. We Came Home  (1977) POW publications; Toluca Lake CA.
Coffee, Gerald. Beyond Survival: Building on the Hard Times- a POW's inspiring story. (1990) GP Putnam's Sons New York

References

Living people
1938 births
United States Air Force officers
United States Air Force personnel of the Vietnam War
American Vietnam War pilots
Vietnam War prisoners of war
Shot-down aviators